Here Come the Freeloaders (Spanish: Ahí vienen los gorrones) is a 1953 Mexican comedy film directed by Gilberto Martínez Solares and starring Lilia del Valle, Antonio Espino and Manuel Palacios.

Cast
 Lilia del Valle as Rosita Rios 
 Antonio Espino as Martín  
 
 Estanislao Schillinsky as Miguel Hernández  
 Fernando Soto as Cachetes 
 Yolanda Montes as Bailarina  
 Verónica Loyo as Lola 
 Celia Viveros as Eufrosina  
 Juan García as Don Octaviano  
 Elisa Berumen as Doña Febronia  
 Los Tatos 
 Amparo Arozamena as Artemisa  
 Diana Ochoa as Mujer busca nodriza  
 Armando Arriola as Gonzalo  
 Federico Curiel as Abogado  
 Eulalio González as Comisario  
 Ildefonso Sánchez Curiel 
 Dumbo y Yáñez 
 Petrolini 
 Ismael Larumbe as Actor en escena  
 Carlos Sánchez Hurtado 
 Chel López
 José René Ruiz as Pequeño César

References

Bibliography 
 María Luisa Amador. Cartelera cinematográfica, 1950-1959. UNAM, 1985.

External links 
 

1953 films
1953 comedy films
Mexican comedy films
1950s Spanish-language films
Films directed by Gilberto Martínez Solares
Mexican black-and-white films
1950s Mexican films